Grabner is a German surname. Notable people with the surname include:

 Hermann Grabner (1886–1969), Austrian composer and music teacher
 Maximilian Grabner (1905–1948), Austrian Nazi Gestapo chief in Auschwitz executed for crimes against humanity
 Michael Grabner (born 1987), Austrian professional ice hockey player
 Michelle Grabner (born 1962), American painter
 Siegfried Grabner (born 1975), Austrian professional snowboarder

See also 
 Graebner
 Marshall Station, California, United States settlement formerly known as Grabners

German-language surnames